"Second Minute or Hour" is the first single by singer-songwriter Jack Peñate, taken from his debut album Matinée. The single was re-released on 24 September 2007. It reached number 17 on the UK Singles Chart.

The single also features a cover of Beats International hit song "Dub Be Good to Me".

The music video shows the singer running along the raised section of the promenade on Brighton Beach.

External links
 
 

2007 singles
XL Recordings singles
2007 songs
Song recordings produced by Jim Abbiss